The white-winged collared dove (Streptopelia reichenowi) is a species of bird in the family Columbidae.
Its natural habitats are subtropical or tropical moist lowland forest, subtropical or tropical dry shrubland, plantations and urban areas in Ethiopia, Kenya and Somalia. It is currently threatened by habitat loss.

References

white-winged collared dove
Birds of the Horn of Africa
white-winged collared dove
Taxonomy articles created by Polbot